Radio Romance is the eighth studio album by American country music artist Eddie Rabbitt, released in 1982.

Background
The album spawned three singles in total. "You and I" was the lead single, a duet with Crystal Gayle, written by Frank J. Myers. It was a major country pop crossover hit for both artists, topping the US and Canadian Country Songs chart, and peaking at #7 on the American Billboard Hot 100 chart, as well as #2 on the Billboard Adult Contemporary chart. The second single "You Can't Run from Love" also topped the US and Canadian Country Songs chart, while peaking at #55 on the Billboard Hot 100 chart, as well as #2 on the Billboard Adult Contemporary chart. The final single was "Our Love Will Survive", released in 1983, including the B-Side "You Put the Beat in my Heart" from Rabbitt's Greatest Hits Volume II compilation. It was not a commercial success. The Radio Romance album reached #5 on the American Top Country Albums chart, as well as #31 on the Billboard 200.

The song "Years After You" was written by Thom Schuyler, and would later be recorded by American country music artist John Conlee in 1984, who reached #2 on both the American and Canadian Country Songs charts. "Good Night for Falling in Love" would later be covered in 1984 by Hillary Kanter, who released it as a single which peaked at #51 on the Country Singles chart in America.

Recording
In 1982, Rabbitt began a new tour in Chicago, and soon after he returned to Nashville and the recording studio for a few days. While performing for a week at the MGM Grand in Las Vegas, he would work on mixing the Radio Romance album during the daytime while doing two shows a night. The album was not as ready as Rabbitt demanded. It was first scheduled for release in August but was pushed back until September. The album's mixing was handled at Nashville's Emerald Sound Studio. It was opened by Stevens and Malloy who worked alongside Rabbitt on many albums including Radio Romance. The album was the first project within the newly opened studio. Initially the studio was not finished at the time the mixing of the album was due to start in October 1982. Malloy decided to have all the equipment temporarily moved into the studio in order to finish the project.

Release
The album was originally released on vinyl LP, cassette and eight-track tape in America and Canada via Elektra. The artwork featured a photograph of Rabbitt displayed next to a radio, which had a woman's hand covering it. Later Capitol Records released the album on CD for the first time in 1990, however this is now out-of-print. This release featured new artwork, featuring a close-up photograph of Rabbitt. In 2008 the album was issued as an MP3 download on such sites as Amazon and iTunes. In 1983, Elektra issued a music-sheet book covering all tracks on the album.

Critical reception

From contemporary reviews, Mark S. Wisnjewski of the Reading Eagle observed that "as a songwriter/performer, Rabbitt has nicely mastered the 'hook.'" He added that "at least eight of the 10 tunes on his new LP sound like 45 releases - they are that commercially 'catchy.'" Singling out "You Can't Run from Love" and "You Got Me Now" as potential single hits, Wisniewski further stated that "perhaps the most amazing 'slight-of-ear' on Radio Romance is Rabbitt's ability to take his major weakness and disguise it as a strength. Strip away the multiple-tracking, the echo and the harmonizing female voices, and one discovers Rabbitt has a surprisingly nondescript limited vocal range." Ken Tucker of The Philadelphia Inquirer gave the album a two star out of five rating. He opined: 

Peter Reilly of Stereo Review commented that "[Rabbitt is] good with something like 'Bedroom Eyes', but even there he seems at times to be counting flowers on the wall rather than concentrating on the supposed object of his desire."

Track listing

Personnel
Eddie Rabbitt - acoustic guitar, lead vocals, backing vocals
Larry Byrom - electric guitar
Joe Chemay - bass guitar
Anthony Crawford - steel guitar
Crystal Gayle - duet vocals on "You and I"
Dennis Henson - background vocals
David Hungate - bass guitar
Shane Keister - synthesizer
David Malloy - background vocals
Randy McCormick - keyboards, synthesizer
Rick Palombi - background vocals
James Stroud - drums, percussion
Billy Joe Walker Jr. - electric guitar

Chart performance

Album

Singles

References

1982 albums
Eddie Rabbitt albums
Albums produced by David Malloy
Elektra Records albums
Liberty Records albums